The Eleventh Van Cliburn International Piano Competition took place in Fort Worth, Texas from May 25 to June 10, 2001.

Olga Kern and Stanislav Ioudenitch won the competition ex-aequo, while Maxim Philippov and Antonio Pompa-Baldi shared the silver medal. It was the first time the two pianists earned the top prize.

The Eleventh Van Cliburn International Piano Competition was the first time in the history of the competition that the Van Cliburn Foundation commissioned more than one original composition. At the suggestion of composer John Corigliano, a 25-member nominating committee of distinguished musicians issued invitations to 42 noted American composers to submit solo piano scores 8 to 12 minutes in length. Thirty-one scores were submitted. Original works by four American composers were chosen: C. Curtis-Smith, Lowell Liebermann, James Mobberley, and Judith Lang Zaimont.

Jurors
  John Giordano (chairman)
  Marcello Abbado
  Joaquín Achúcarro
  Eileen Tate Cline
  Richard Dyer
  Claude Frank
  Thomas Frost
  Andrzej Jasinski
  Yoheved Kaplinsky
  Jürgen Meyer-Hosten
  Jean-Marc Peysson
  Menahem Pressler
  Guangren Zhou

Results

References

Van Cliburn International Piano Competition